Lachlan Skipworth (born 1982) is an Australian composer based in Perth, Western Australia.

His works span across orchestral, chamber, vocal and experimental music and is heavily influenced by the Japanese shakuhachi and the honkyoku aesthetic.

Skipworth co-founded the new music ensemble Intercurrent in 2015, along with percussionist Louise Devenish, pianist Emily Green-Armytage and clarinettist Ashley William Smith. He also founded the chamber music collective Cygnus Arioso with his wife, violinist Akiko Miyazawa. Both ensembles are based in Perth, Western Australia.

Education 
Skipworth played in a wind quintet in high school, which introduced him to chamber music.

Skipworth studied at the University of Western Australia, earning a Bachelor of Music Education at the UWA Conservatorium of Music, where he studied with composers Roger Smalley and Iain Grandage and wrote his first serious compositions.

He traveled to Japan to learn shakuhachi for three years. Skipworth's main shakuhachi teachers were the revered masters Kakizakai Kaoru and Yokoyama Katsuya, and has been mentored by shakuhachi grand master Riley Lee.

In 2008, he moved to Sydney, New South Wales to study at the Sydney Conservatorium of Music (M.Mus., Ph.D.) and studied with Anne Boyd. Between 2010 and 2011, he spent two semesters in Germany undertaking a kontaktstudium at the Freiburg Hochschule fur Musik with composer and clarinettist Jorg Widmann. Skipworth graduated with a Ph.D. in composition in December 2016.

Career 
After winning the Paul Lowin Prize for orchestral composition in 2016, Skipworth earned a string of major commissions and appointments. The winning work, Concerto for Clarinet and Orchestra, earned the APRA Art Music Award for Performance of the Year, and was chosen by ABC Classic FM to be presented at the 2016 International Rostrum of Composers in Poland. In 2016, he was appointed composer-in-residence with the West Australian Symphony Orchestra. His work Spiritus was a finalist in the Paul Lowin Orchestral Prizes in 2019. 

The International Society for Contemporary Music selected his works dark nebulae and Clarinet Quintet as the official Australian work at their World Music Days in Slovenia (2015) and Vancouver (2017) respectively.

His work has also been performed by the Queensland Symphony Orchestra, Melbourne Symphony Orchestra, New England Philharmonic, Tokyo Philharmonic Chorus.

In 2019, he collaborated with Australian indigenous singer Don Nunggarrgalu and the Darwin Symphony Orchestra. 

In 2020, Skipworth was one of the composers commissioned as part of Sydney Symphony Orchestra's 50 Fanfares project.

Psalterphone 
Skipworth invented the psalterphone for his work The Night Sky Fall. The instrument combines the layout of a psaltery with the sound of a bowed vibraphone.

Discography 
Skipworth's Chamber Works vol. 2 debuted at #1 on the ARIA Top 20 Classical/Crossover Albums chart.

Awards and nominations

ARIA Music Awards
The ARIA Music Awards is an annual awards ceremony that recognises excellence, innovation, and achievement across all genres of Australian music. They commenced in 1987. 

! 
|-
| 2022
| Chamber Works, Vol. 2
| ARIA Award for Best Classical Album
| 
| 
|}

Other awards

References 

1982 births
Australian composers
Living people